Grossinger Motors Arena (formerly known as U.S. Cellular Coliseum and simply the Coliseum) is an arena in downtown Bloomington, Illinois.  It is on the southwest corner of Madison Street (US-51) and Front Street. The arena opened to the public on April 1, 2006.

Description
Its seating capacity is approximately 5,500 for hockey and indoor football games and 8,000 for concerts. The arena has 800 club seats, 24 luxury suites, and two party suites.

The arena also has a basketball floor.

The arena annually hosts local high school graduation ceremonies (Bloomington High School, Normal Community High School and Normal West High School) as well as the local community college's graduation ceremony (Heartland Community College).

The arena is connected to the Bloomington Ice Center which is located in the same building, and it has no rights to the Bloomington Ice Center, also known as the Pepsi Ice Center, which is a public ice rink run by Bloomington's Parks & Recreation Department. It hosts the Illinois State University Redbirds hockey club. The center features open skating, as well as lessons and hockey leagues. It is also the home of the State Farm Holiday Classic, one of the largest, co-ed high school holiday basketball tournaments in the nation, featuring 64 varsity teams participating throughout Bloomington-Normal.

Controversy
The arena has been a burden on city finances due to operational losses from lack of sponsorships. Though bookings increased, the lack of local city population is a continued problem. There have been criminal proceedings over allegations of fraud, embezzlement and theft by the past management company, CIAM.

References

External links
Official Site

Indoor arenas in Illinois
Indoor ice hockey venues in Illinois
Basketball venues in Illinois
Sports venues in Bloomington–Normal
Music venues in Illinois
Sports venues completed in 2006